Mount Elephant is a  conical breached scoria cone formed by a  dormant volcano, located 1 km from the town of Derrinallum in southwestern Victoria, Australia. It is a prominent landmark that forms the eastern gateway to the Kanawinka Geopark from the Hamilton Highway at Derrinallum.

Formation and history
Scoria cones are small volcanoes with relatively steep sides, usually formed as the result of a single major episode of volcanic activity. Lava lakes often form in the centre of scoria cones; if the lava in such a lake breaches the side of the cone, the result is a breached scoria cone, such as Mount Elephant. The volcano first erupted approximately 184,000 years ago, within a tolerance of 38,000 years, according to argon-argon dating research first published 21 February 2017. There are approximately 200 breached scoria cones in Victoria.

During early European settlement, the mountain was known as "Swagmans Lighthouse" or the "light house of the western district".

Mount Elephant was once quarried for its red/black scoria, and evidence of the quarry is visible at the base of its cone. The first of three quarries began on the north slope in 1910 and closed in 1913. The second quarry, known as the 'old commercial pit' operated from the 1950s and closed in the 1990s. The last mining operations were undertaken by the Corangamite Shire and have now stopped. The scoria that was quarried from Mount Elephant was used to make many of the roads and buildings in and around the town of Derrinallum.

The mountain was privately owned until 2000, when it was purchased by the Trust for Nature and the local community. The aim is to revegetate the area and promote local tourism.

Aboriginal history
The language group of the Aboriginal people whom lived nearest to Mount Elephant is called Djargurd Wurrong, and the mountain stands close to the border of other language groups, including Wathawurrung, Gulidjan, and Girai wurrung(Clark, 1990). During European colonisation in the 1830s, Mount Elephant was located within the territory of the clan Teerinyillum Gundidj, part of the larger Djargurd Wurrung language group.

The Wathawurrung name for the mount, Djerrinallum, means "nest of sea swallows, terns" (Dawson, 1881). A slightly earlier source (Porteous, 1878) had stated the name to mean "a hill of fire... and is also the name of a local clan Djerrinallum gundidj". In the notes to his 2011 translation of the dreamtine story Derrinallum ba Buninyong however, Joel Wright says that the name Derrinallum, means "home of sea swallows or terns frequenting neighbouring marshes", in the Girai wurrung (called by him "Keerray woorroong") language. According to James Dawson, "The Mount Shadwell tribe and its language are called 'Kirae wuurong,' 'blood lip.' with Kuurndit ["member of"] affixed for a member of the tribe. Its territory commences at the Hopkins Hill sheepwash on the Hopkins River, and extends to Mount Fyans, Mount Elephant, Cloven Hills, Minninguurt, Mount Noorat, Keilambete Lake, Framlingham aboriginal station, and up the east side of the Hopkins River to starting point."

The photographer Fred Kruger (1831–1888) took a photograph of the Derrinallum Aboriginal man King Tom in 1877, while he was at Coranderrk. Kruger's photograph was made into a lithograpic print around 1880, included with "portraits of surviving leaders of Aboriginal tribes of Victoria, originally taken at various times between around 1866 and 1878" published under the title Album of the Kings &​ Queens of Victoria. He was painted by Robert Hawker Dowling (1827–1886) in 1856. The painting, entitled Aborigines in a Bark Hut: King Tom of the Mount Elephant Tribe, is in the collection of the National Library of Australia. Tom lived at Meningoort Station, [source missing] about 25 km south-west of Mount Elephant, north of Camperdown and west of Lake Bookaar.  Meningoort Station still exists in Corangamite Shire and has remained in the McArthur family since Scottish immigrant, Peter McArthur, squatted on the land in 1837. [link broken, source needed]

See also

 List of mountains in Victoria
 List of volcanoes in Australia

References

External links
 Mount Elephant, Derrinallum, Revisited 2022
 Kanawinka Geopark, Victoria & South Australia
 Derrinallum, Revisited 2022
 New site for Mount Elephant Community Management Inc.

Cinder cones
Volcanoes of Victoria (Australia)
Mountains of Victoria (Australia)
Inactive volcanoes
Mountains of Barwon South West (region)